Empire Glory (foaled April 8, 1981) was a Thoroughbred racehorse who was sold for a world record price as a yearling in 1982. He proved to be just short of top class in a brief racing career, winning the Royal Whip Stakes and finishing second in the Irish St Leger. He made little impact as a breeding stallion.

Background
Empire Glory was a bay or brown horse bred in Kentucky by Mortin Levy & Myron Rosenthal's Glencoe Farm. His dam Spearfish had won the Hollywood Oaks in 1966 and had produced the leading North American racehorse King's Bishop and the Irish 1000 Guineas winner Gaily. Through Gaily, she was also the ancestor of Pilsudski. Empire Glory was sired by the Triple Crown winner Nijinsky.

In 1982 he was consigned by Glencoe Farm to the Keeneland Sales where he was sold for a record-setting $4.25 million ($ million inflation adjusted) to the bloodstock agents BBA (Ireland) on behalf of the British businessman Robert Sangster after a prolonged bidding battle with representatives of Sheikh Mohammed. The colt was sent to Europe and was trained by Vincent O'Brien at Ballydoyle.

Racing career
Empire Glory raced only as a three-year-old in the 1984 season. After refusing to enter the starting stalls on his first racecourse appearance he finished second in his first completed race and then won a maiden race at Leopardstown by six lengths. He was then stepped up in class for the Grade Three Royal Whip Stakes over one and a half miles at the Curragh Racecourse in July. Ridden by Pat Eddery, he won by three quarters of a length from Sondrio and Yawa. In his two remaining races, Empire Glory was equipped with blinkers. He finished third to Arctic Lord in the Beresford Stakes and then produced his best effort when finishing second, a neck behind the filly Opale, in the Group One Irish St Leger.

Stud record
Empire Glory stood as a breeding stallion in the USA. He sired several minor winners but nothing of top class. He died in 2001.

Pedigree

Empire Glory was inbred 4 × 4 to Nearco, meaning that this stallion appears twice in the fourth generation of his pedigree.

References

1981 racehorse births
2001 racehorse deaths
Racehorses bred in Kentucky
Racehorses trained in Ireland
Thoroughbred family 11